The 2013 FA Community Shield (also known as The FA Community Shield sponsored by McDonald's for sponsorship reasons) was the 91st FA Community Shield, played on 11 August 2013 at Wembley Stadium, between the winners of the previous season's Premier League and FA Cup competitions. The match was contested by the champions of the 2012–13 Premier League, Manchester United, and the 2012–13 FA Cup winners, Wigan Athletic. Following Wigan's relegation to the Football League Championship just days after their cup triumph, it was the first time a team from outside the top division featured in the Community Shield since West Ham United in 1980.

Manchester United won the Shield for a record 16th time outright and 20th time overall after a 2–0 win over Wigan Athletic, with Robin van Persie scoring both goals. This season's Shield was especially notable for being David Moyes' only honour as Manchester United manager, in what was his first competitive match in charge of the club following the retirement of Sir Alex Ferguson at the end of the 2012–13 season.

Match

Details

See also

2006 Football League Cup Final
2012–13 Premier League
2012–13 FA Cup

References

FA Community Shield
Community Shield 2013
Charity Shield 2013
Comm
FA Community Shield
FA Community Shield